The Medical Society may refer to various bodies associated with medicine or its provision, including:

Australia
 University of Queensland Medical Society, see Errol Solomon Meyers Memorial Lecture

Canada
 Christian Medical and Dental Society

China
 Medical Missionary Society of China

International
 Assyrian Medical Society
 International General Medical Society for Psychotherapy
 Medical Protection Society
 Undersea and Hyperbaric Medical Society

Iran
 Islamic Association of Iranian Medical Society

Norway
 Norwegian Medical Society

United Kingdom
 Bute Medical Society
 Medical Society of Edinburgh
 Medical and Chirurgical Society of London
 Medical Society of London
 Royal Medical Society
 Ulster Medical Society
 Westminster Medical Society

United States
 Colorado Medical Society
 Connecticut State Medical Society
 Illinois State Medical Society, a state affiliate of the American Medical Association
 Maryland State Medical Society (MedChi)
 Massachusetts Medical Society
 Medical Society of New Jersey
 Medical Society of the State of California, a former name of the California Medical Association
 Medical Society of Tennessee, a former name of the Tennessee Medical Association
 Michigan State Medical Society
 New York County Medical Society
 North Carolina Medical Society, see Susan Dimock
 Pennsylvania Medical Society
 Rhode Island Medical Society
 Syrian American Medical Society
 Vermont Medical Society
 Medical Society of Virginia
 Wilderness Medical Society

See also
 Association of the Scientific Medical Societies in Germany